In November 2011, the rights to air the show was sold to nine areas in Asia, namely Taiwan, Thailand, Indonesia, China, Hong Kong, Japan, Singapore, Cambodia, and Malaysia, proving Running Man's rise in popularity as a Hallyu program. In January 2013, SBS announced Running Man in Asia as one of the big projects of 2013. Producer Jo Hyo-jin stated that the program would be touring two countries in Asia in the first half of 2013. The program has previously travelled to Thailand, China, and Hong Kong for filming. Jo Hyo-jin has also mentioned interests raised by Singaporean television stations in purchasing the Running Man format, which reiterated Running Mans popularity in Asia.

Producer Im Hyung-taek confirmed that the program would be filming in Macau, China and Hanoi, Vietnam in early February, and the respective episodes were aired on television in late February and early March. In February 2014, Jo Hyo-jin announced that the program was invited by the Australian Tourist Commission to film in Australia, and did so in mid-February which aired in March.

A spin-off of Running Man, titled Keep Running, was announced in May 2014. The spin-off, which is the Chinese version of Running Man was scheduled to air in the fourth quarter of 2014 on Zhejiang Television. Cast from the Korean version will participate in the Chinese version as well. The spin-off was a success, and currently the show has aired its fourth season. There was also an Indonesian adaptation of the show, titled Mission X, following a similar format on the show, with the exception that the members would using armbands, and the games would be played just for fun rather than playing it to win the prize.

International episodes
The popularity of Running Man throughout Asia provided the opportunity to take the show outside of South Korea. Running Man has traveled to various countries including China, Thailand, Vietnam, Australia, Indonesia, Taiwan, and the United Arab Emirates. International episodes are notable for their ability to draw large groups of fans to mission venues.

References

Lists of Running Man (TV series) episodes